Miriam Nelson (born Miriam Lois Frankel; September 21, 1919 – August 12, 2018) was an American choreographer, dancer, and actress.

Career 
Nelson first performed at Casa Manana in New York, where she danced with Van Johnson in the nightclub's revue. She debuted on Broadway in Sing Out the News (1938)..

Nelson was a contract performer with Paramount. She worked in films such as Double Indemnity, Tea for Two and Breakfast at Tiffany's. She worked with people such as Judy Garland and Doris Day.

Personal life 
Nelson was married to actor Gene Nelson from 1941 to 1956. In 2009, she published a biography, My Life Dancing with the Stars. She died on August 12, 2018, at the age of 98.

Filmography
Let's Face It (1943) as dancer
Lady in the Dark (1944) as dancer
Cover Girl (1944) as specialty dancer
Double Indemnity (1944) as Keye's secretary
Hail the Conquering Hero (1945) as tap dancer
Duffy's Tavern (1945) as dancer
Kitty (1945) as girl with St. Leger
Masquerade in Mexico (1938) as party guest
Breakfast at Tiffany's (1961) as Harriet

Television credits
Father Knows Best (1959) as Miss Harris (1 episode)
Pete Kelly's Blues (1959) as Thelma Reegan (1 episode)
The Untouchables (1959) as Grace Halloran (1 episode)
Bronco (1960) as Emmy Coles (1 episode)
U.S. Marshal (1960) as Polly Gregory (1 episode)
Westinghouse Playhouse (1961) as Miriam (1 episode)
Death Valley Days (1961) as Mrs. Clayton (1 episode)
Mister Ed (1962) as Miss Canfield (1 episode)
The Lucy Show (1965) as Miriam (1 episode)
Mrs. Columbo (1979) as ballet instructor (1 episode)

References

External links

1919 births
2018 deaths
American film actresses
20th-century American actresses
American choreographers
American dancers
21st-century American women